The Heaven Belongs to You Tour was the fifth and final headlining concert tour by American rap collective Brockhampton. The tour began on October 26, 2019, in Vancouver, and concluded on December 13, 2019, in Los Angeles.

Background and development
On August 26, 2019, Brockhampton announced they would be embarking on their fifth headlining concert tour, in support of their fifth album, Ginger. Brockhampton was supported by experimental duo 100 Gecs, and British rapper Slowthai.

Tour dates

Notes

References

2019 concert tours